Boris Johnson carried out the first significant reshuffle of his majority government on 13 February 2020. Following the December 2019 general election, there was considerable speculation that Johnson was planning a major reshuffle of the Cabinet, to take place after the United Kingdom's official withdrawal from the European Union on 31 January 2020. There were reports that up to a third of the Cabinet would be dismissed, Whitehall departments abolished and civil servants replaced by policy experts; however, the reshuffle was smaller than expected and no departments were abolished. The anticipated reshuffle was nicknamed "The St Valentine's Day Massacre" in the press, due to its proximity to St Valentine's Day, the name being a reference to the 1929 gangland shooting in Chicago.

Johnson formed his first ministry on 24 July 2019, following his election as Leader of the Conservative Party and subsequent appointment as Prime Minister of the United Kingdom. In September 2019, he carried out small reshuffles in response to the resignations of two Cabinet ministers (Jo Johnson and Amber Rudd). After the Conservative Party's victory in the 2019 general election, Johnson's only change had been to fill the position left vacant by Alun Cairns' resignation in the previous month.

On 13 February 2020, Johnson reshuffled the government. Five Cabinet ministers were sacked, including the Northern Ireland Secretary Julian Smith, a decision that was criticised by several politicians and commentators following Smith's success in restoring the devolved Northern Ireland Executive under the terms of the New Decade, New Approach agreement. Chancellor of the Exchequer Sajid Javid resigned from the Cabinet after refusing Johnson's demand that he dismiss his advisers.

This was the last major cabinet reshuffle before the COVID-19 pandemic in the United Kingdom, and was followed by two more reshuffles in 2021 and 2022.

Cabinet-level changes

Junior ministerial changes

Whips' Office appointments

Reaction

Dismissal of Julian Smith 

The decision to dismiss Julian Smith as Secretary of State for Northern Ireland was criticised by a number of prominent political figures in Northern Ireland, including SDLP leader Colum Eastwood who described the move as showing "dangerous indifference" by the Prime Minister. Smith had been widely seen as instrumental in securing a cross-party deal to restore the Northern Ireland Executive, the New Decade, New Approach agreement, after three years without a devolved government in Stormont. Tributes to Smith's tenure as Northern Ireland Secretary were paid by NI First Minister Arlene Foster and Taoiseach Leo Varadkar. Both praised him for his role in ending the political deadlock in the country.

Many political commentators expressed their surprise at Smith's dismissal, given his perceived success during his time as Secretary of State for Northern Ireland. Some suggested that Smith's testimony to the Northern Ireland Affairs Select Committee in October 2019, in which he described a potential no-deal Brexit as being "a very, very bad idea for Northern Ireland", had influenced the decision to remove him from his position. Stephen Bush, political editor of the New Statesman, speculated that the consequence of Johnson's removal of Smith would be the destabilisation of the new power-sharing agreement and increased difficulty in negotiating the details of the "New Protocol".

Resignation of Sajid Javid 

Tensions between 10 Downing Street and the Treasury had come to a head in August 2019, when the Prime Minister's Chief Special Adviser Dominic Cummings dismissed one of Chancellor Sajid Javid's aides, Sonia Khan, without Javid's permission and without informing him. It was alleged that, during her dismissal, Cummings "went outside No 10 and asked an armed officer to enter the building and escort Khan off the premises." In November 2019, following questions of a rift between the two men, Johnson gave his assurance that he would retain Javid as Chancellor after the 2019 general election.

However, in the weeks leading up to the reshuffle, a number of briefings in the press had suggested that a new economic ministry led by Rishi Sunak might be established, to reduce the power and political influence of the Treasury. Sunak was considered to be a Johnson loyalist, seen as the "rising star" minister who had ably represented the Prime Minister during the 2019 election debates. By February 2020, it was reported that Javid would remain in his role as Chancellor and that Sunak would stay on as Chief Secretary to the Treasury, in order to "keep an eye" on Javid.

On 13 February 2020, the day of the reshuffle, Javid resigned as Chancellor of the Exchequer, following a meeting with the Prime Minister. During the meeting, Johnson had offered to allow Javid to keep his position on the condition that he dismiss all his advisers at the Treasury and replace them with ones selected by 10 Downing Street. Upon resigning, Javid told the Press Association that "no self-respecting minister would accept those terms".

The Chancellor's resignation had been unexpected, given Johnson's commitment to keep him in the Cabinet and recent reports that a rival finance ministry would not be created. Robert Shrimsley, chief political commentator of the Financial Times, warned that the Prime Minister's handling of his relationship with Javid could damage the government. He argued that "good government often depends on senior ministers – and the chancellor in particular – being able to fight bad ideas. Mr Johnson's cabinet has just seen the price of defiance".

See also 
2021 British cabinet reshuffle
Second Johnson ministry
Premiership of Boris Johnson
List of departures from the second Johnson ministry
2020 in politics and government

Notes

References 

Cabinet reshuffles in the United Kingdom
Boris Johnson
February 2020 events in the United Kingdom
2020 in British politics
Rishi Sunak